Here is a list of historical and current Fencing Clubs that run within Universities.

Australia

England

Wales

See also
Australian Fencing Federation

References

Fencing organizations
Fencing clubs
University Fencing